Note: In order to be recognised as a true national team and not simply expatriates (for the purposes of this entry), the list is subject to International Cup eligibility rules.

Australian Football League has official affiliation agreements with 15 international governing bodies, ARFL Ireland, AFL Canada, Danish Australian Football League, AFL Scotland, AFL England, AFL Wales, AFL Japan, Nauru Australian Football Association, AFL New Zealand, USAFL, AFL South Africa, AFL PNG, AFL Samoa, Tonga Australian Football Association, AFL Germany and AFL Middle East, although it has working relations with leagues and clubs in further countries.

However, while these affiliations are in place, Australia is the only nation that actively engages in this sport at a professional level.

Africa

Countries with established league(s) and non-Australian-based national team:

Other nations with some history of Australian Rules:

Americas

Countries with established league(s) and non-Australian-based national team:

Other countries with some history of Australian Rules:

Asia
Main articles: Australian rules football in Asia and Australian rules football in the Middle East

Countries with an established league(s) and non-Australian-based national team:

Countries with at least one active club and/or national team including Australian players:

Countries with some history of Australian Rules and/or a club in development:

Europe

+Countries with an established league and/or non-Australian-based national team:

Countries with at least one active club and/or national team including Australian players:

Other countries with some history of Australian Rules:

Oceania

Countries with active league(s) and national teams.

Other countries with some history of Australian Rules:

See also

References

External links
Australian Football International

Australian rules football
Australian rules football-related lists